Vyshkovo is an urban-type settlement in Khust Raion (district) of Zakarpattia Oblast (province) in western Ukraine., firstly mentioned in the year 1281. The town's population was 8,142 as of the 2001 Ukrainian Census. Current population: . In 2001 45% of the population was of ethnic Hungarian origin.

Vyshkovo is located in the historic region of Northern Maramureș, along the banks of the Tysa River near modern-day Romania. In the past, its location was suited for a castle, although almost nothing remains of it today except for some fortification remnants.

References

Urban-type settlements in Khust Raion
Populated places established in the 13th century